Deh-e Hajji (also Romanized as Deh-e Ḩājjī and Deh Hājī) is a village in Chalanchulan Rural District, Silakhor District, Dorud County, Lorestan Province, Iran. At the 2006 census, its population was 385, in 95 families.

References 

Towns and villages in Dorud County